This article provides information on the under-16 premiership deciders of rugby league competitions held on the Central Coast of New South Wales, Australia. The match details sub-section details the individual point-scorers in a match, where known. In 1996 and all but one season since 2003, a second tier under-16 competition has also been held.

The current competition is conducted under the auspices of the Central Coast Division Junior Rugby League, an affiliate of NSW Country Rugby League and the New South Wales Rugby League.

A predecessor to the under-16 competition was D Grade, which was held from 1955 to 1966. When Group status was obtained in 1967, C and D Grade became under 19 and under 17. This was changed again the following year, 1968, to under 18 and under 16.
 
The junior body, or association, switched from weight-based divisions to age-based divisions in 1971, with under 15 the oldest.

In 1979, the youth competitions reverted to being under 19 and under 17. This changed again in 1983. The under-18 competition remained under the control of the senior body and continued to be played on Sundays prior to grade matches. The junior association took on the under-16 competition, with matches played on Saturdays.

Division 1

Match details
1968
WYONG 8 (Glen Vigor, Paul Merrick tries; David Drady goal) defeated ERINA 3 (Graham Quill try) at Sohier Park on Sunday, September 15, 1968.

1969
WOY WOY 13 (Terry Roberts 2, Peter Hall tries; Graham Eadie 2 goals) defeated GOSFORD 5 (Andrew Carlin try; Anthony Callaghan goal) on Sunday, September 21, 1969. Referee: Bill Kirwin.

1970s
1970
WYONG 14 (Chris Williams, Phil Jurd, Frank Sturgess, Ian Nelson tries; Col Peel goal) defeated GOSFORD 9 (L. Bourke try; Neil Jones 3 goals) at Grahame Park on Sunday, September 20, 1970.

1971
GOSFORD 32 (Andrew Carlin 2, Mick Friend 2, Andrew Babekhul, Barry Weinert, Malcolm Brown, P. Needham tries; John Rankin, Barry Weinert 3 goals) defeated WYONG nil at Grahame Park on Sunday, September 26, 1971.

1972
OURIMBAH 14 (Peter Wilkins, Gary Sharpe, J. Maher tries; Mark Austin 2 goals and field goal) defeated THE ENTRANCE 11 (Jim Harvey 2, Peter Bean tries; Ken Hey goal) at Grahame Park on Sunday, September 10, 1972.

1973
WOY WOY 9 (Ken Johnson 2, Harry Wheeler tries) defeated ERINA 6 (Greg Smith, Bill Wassens tries) in extra-time at Grahame Park on Sunday, September 16, 1973.

1974
THE ENTRANCE 4 (W. Kinsella try; unnamed field goal) defeated ERINA 3 (M. Hourigan try) at Grahame Park on Sunday, September 29, 1974.

1975
The Grand final was held at Grahame Park on Sunday, September 21, 1975. Erina and The Entrance were the competing teams. The result was not published in the Wyong Advocate and just one issue, Wednesday, September 23, of the then daily Central Coast Express survives on microfilm. Consequently, the result is unknown to the author.

1976
GOSFORD 12 (Alan Cochran, B. Lynch tries; Rodney Austine 3 goals) defeated WYONG 10 (Jeff Morton, Graham Cheal tries; Graham Cheal 2 goals) on Sunday, September 12, 1976.

1977
WYONG 13 (Tony Murray, Alan Cole, Brian Newman tries; Ian Thompson 2 goals) defeated ERINA 5 (Chris Bradbury try; B. Hickey goal) at Grahame Park on Sunday, September 18, 1977.

1978
ERINA 13 (Max Wilkie, Paul Edwards, Glen Ritchie tries; Max Wilkie 2 goals) defeated WYONG 6 (Stephen Baker, Dennis Rose tries) at Grahame Park on Sunday, September 17, 1978.

1980s
1983
WOY WOY 9 (Marc Matthews, Greg Melnik tries; Ken Fuller field goal) defeated TOUKLEY 6 (Darren Georgeston try; Richard Raymond goal) at Grahame Park on Saturday, August 27, 1983.

1984
WYONG 12 (two tries) defeated THE ENTRANCE 4 (one try) at Grahame Park on Saturday, August 25, 1984.

1985
TERRIGAL 16 (D. Bissaker 2, G. Bezrouchko tries; Billy Felton 2 goals) defeated TOUKLEY 12 (Matthew Thorne, S. Sbrugnera tries; B. Dixon 2 goals) at Grahame Park on August 24, 1985. Referee: B. Saunders.

1986
WYONG 30 (P. Sternbeck, Steven Carter, F. Brooks, Adam Aiken, Darren Akhurst, P. Maish tries; M. Hayes 2, P. Hughes goals) defeated GOSFORD nil at Grahame Park on Saturday, August 23, 1986. Referee: R. Saunders.

1987
WOY WOY 10 (D. Waterson, M. Winspear tries; A. Campbell goal) defeated TOUKLEY 4 (J. Biddle try) at Grahame Park on Saturday, August 29, 1987. Referee: B. Saunders.

1988
GOSFORD 18 (Shane Nelson 2, Kim Dawes, Troy Herbert tries; Troy Kent goal) defeated SAINT EDWARDS 8 (Andrew Burg, Julian Banningham tries) at Grahame Park on Saturday, August 27, 1988. Referee: B. Saunders.

1989
WOY WOY 16 (Jason Pilling, Danny Williams, Warren Staunton tries; Craig Makepeace 2 goals) defeated WYONG 6 (Mark Holstein try; Brett Vanagas goal) at Grahame Park on Saturday, August 26, 1989. Referee: B. Saunders.

1990s
1990
ERINA 8 (Brett McKay, Matthew Geercke tries) defeated OURIMBAH 6 (Chris James try; Graham Wilson goal) at Grahame Park on Saturday, August 25, 1990. Referee: B. Saunders.

1991
MUNMORAH 22 (D. Lewis 2, Mark Ivers, C. Patt tries; D. Lewis, S. Barwick goals) defeated UMINA 12 (B. Dugram, A. Bugden tries; S. Duffies 2 goals) in extra-time at Grahame Park on Saturday, August 31, 1991. Referee: R. Saunders.

1992
TERRIGAL-WAMBERAL 13 (Phil Coles, Glenn Morrison tries; Kelvin McDonald 2 goals; Glenn Morrison field goal) defeated BERKELEY VALE 10 (Michael Stewart, David Hourigan tries; Paul Stringer goals) at Grahame Park on Saturday, September 5, 1992. Referee: K. Menchin.

1993
TERRIGAL-WAMBERAL 20 (Michael Erickson, Matt Hunter, Shannon Hunter tries; Blake Mulherron 4 goals) defeated WYONG 12 (Dean Amos 2 tries; Dean Amos 2 goals) at Grahame Park on Saturday, September 4, 1993. Referee: R. Saunders.

1996
WYONG 28 (Michael Black 2, Gavin Fardy 2, Alex Starrett 2 tries; Lance Lloyd 2 goals) defeated THE ENTRANCE 12 (Gavin Westwood, Ryan O’Hara tries; Ryan O’Hara 2 goals) at Grahame Park on Saturday, August 24, 1996.

1997
ST EDWARDS 8 (Lee Brown try; Simon Thom 2 goals) defeated WOY WOY 4 (Daniel Biernat try) at Grahame Park on Saturday, September 6, 1997.

1998
WYONG 20 defeated UMINA 12 at Grahame Park on Saturday, September 12, 1998.

1999
KINCUMBER 12 defeated WYONG 10 on Sunday, September 12, 1999.

2000s
2000
THE ENTRANCE 36 defeated UMINA nil at North Power Stadium, Grahame Park on Saturday, August 19, 2000.

2001
KINCUMBER 18 defeated WYONG 12 on September 15, 2001.

2002
WYONG 24 (Chris Cole 2 , Raiff Lawson, Grant Millington Tries Chris Cole 4/4 Goals defeated ST EDW/OURIMBAH 20 James Maloney, David Sainty, Chris Trembath, Aiden Kirk tries James Maloney 2/4 Goals at Central Coast Express Advocate Stadium

2003
ERINA 27 (Blake Laybutt 3 and others tries) defeated BERKELEY VALE 20 at Central Coast Express Advocate Stadium, Grahame Park on Saturday, August 30, 2003.

2004
THE ENTRANCE 14 defeated TERRIGAL 12 at Central Coast Express Advocate Stadium, Grahame Park in September, 2004.

2005
KINCUMBER WHITE 36 (Mitchell Griffin 3 and others tries) defeated TOUKLEY 14 at Central Coast Stadium on September 11, 2005.

2006
THE ENTRANCE 11 defeated KINCUMBER WHITE 10 on Saturday, September 16, 2006.

2007
BERKELEY VALE 34 defeated WYONG 10 at Woy Woy Oval on Saturday, September 15, 2007.

2008
TERRIGAL 24 defeated WYONG 18 on September 6 or 7, 2008.

2009
WYONG 24 defeated 18 at Bluetongue Stadium, Grahame Park on Sunday, September 13, 2009.

2010s
2010
WYONG 16 defeated TERRIGAL-WAMBERAL 12 at Bluetongue Stadium, Grahame Park on Sunday, September 12, 2010.

2011
KINCUMBER 24 defeated WYONG GREEN 10 at Bluetongue Stadium, Grahame Park on Sunday, September 18, 2011.

2012
WYONG 16 defeated OURIMBAH 10 at Bluetongue Stadium, Grahame Park on Sunday, September 9, 2012.

2013
TOUKLEY BLUE 32 (Adam Keighran 2 tries, Luke Gearside Brock Taylor, Jakob Giles, Cameron Catania tries; Adam Keighran 4 goals) defeated WOY WOY RED 6 (Samuel Bovis try; Khaleb Tyson goal) at Bluetongue Stadium, Grahame Park on Sunday, September 15, 2013.

2014
KINCUMBER 26 defeated TOUKLEY 18 at Morrie Breen Oval on Sunday, September 14, 2014.

2015
THE ENTRANCE 40 defeated WYONG 4 at Central Coast Stadium, Grahame Park on Sunday, September 13, 2015.

Division 2
A second-tier Under 16 competition, Under 16-2s, has been held in 1996, between 2003 and 2012, and from 2014 to the present.

Match details
1996
BUDGEWOI-BUFF POINT 34 (Wayne Nies 2, Beau Twyford, Matthew Frost, Cheyne Roberts tries; Justin White 5 goals) defeated KINCUMBER 6 (Brett Cowell try; Nathan Cunningham goal) at Grahame Park on Saturday, August 31, 1996.

2000s
2003
NORTHERN LAKES 32 defeated THE ENTRANCE 30 at Central Coast Express Advocate Stadium, Grahame Park on Saturday, August 30, 2003.

2004
THE ENTRANCE 12 defeated ST EDWARDS 10 at Central Coast Express Advocate Stadium, Grahame Park in September, 2004.

2005
ST EDWARDS 22 defeated GOSFORD-KARIONG 20 at Central Coast Stadium on September 11, 2005.

2006
BERKELEY VALE 12 defeated CENTRAL WYONG 10 on Saturday, September 16, 2006.

2007
BERKELEY VALE 54 defeated GOSFORD-KARIONG 4 at Woy Woy Oval on Saturday, September 15, 2007.

2008
WYONG 32 defeated BUDGEWOI-BUFF POINT 14 on September 6 or 7, 2008.

2009
BUDGEWOI-BUFF POINT 22 defeated UMINA 18 on September 12 or 13, 2009.

2010s
2010
BUDGEWOI-BUFF POINT 22 defeated GOSFORD-KARIONG 10 on September 11 or 12, 2010.

2011
ERINA 52 defeated BLUE HAVEN 10 at Morrie Breen Oval on Saturday, September 17, 2011.

2012
TOUKLEY 34 defeated TERRIGAL-WAMBERAL 24 at Morrie Breen on Sunday, September 8, 2012.

2014
BUDGEWOI-BUFF POINT 30 defeated GOSFORD-KARIONG 24 at Morrie Breen on Sunday, September 14, 2014.

2015
KINCUMBER 24 defeated WYONG 16 at Central Coast Stadium, Grahame Park on Sunday, September 13, 2015.

2016
TOUKLEY 24 defeated WYONG 16 at Central Coast Stadium, Grahame Park on Sunday, September 11, 2016. Barry Deaker; son of Garry Deaker (former Wyong and London halfback) featured for Toukley off the bench. Ritesh Joggers was trainer for Toukley that day and is credited by the Toukley team as being instrumental in their performance, delivering the team with an inspiring half time talk.

References

Sources

 Microfilm of the following newspapers are available at the State Library of New South Wales and Central Coast Council libraries at Gosford and Wyong. The RAV numbers provided are those used by the State Library. 
  Central Coast Express (RAV 61) 
  Wyong and Lakes District Advocate (RAV 178)
  Wyong Shire Advocate (RAV 824)
 Erina Rugby League Football Club
 Woy Woy Roosters
 Fox Sports Pulse
 The following books are available at the Tuggerah Branch of the Central Coast Council Libraries
 
 

C
Australian rugby league lists
Rugby League
grand finals